Aristotelis Karagiannidis (born 15 June 1990) is a Greek professional footballer who plays as a centre-back for Super League 2 club Karaiskakis, for which he is captain.

References

1990 births
Living people
Greek footballers
Super League Greece players
Gamma Ethniki players
Football League (Greece) players
Super League Greece 2 players
Egaleo F.C. players
Tilikratis F.C. players
Doxa Kranoula F.C. players
PAE Kerkyra players
Pierikos F.C. players
A.E. Karaiskakis F.C. players
Association football defenders
Footballers from Ioannina
21st-century Greek people